San Marzano sul Sarno is a town and comune in the province of Salerno in the Campania region of southern Italy, situated about halfway between Autostrade A3 and A30.

History
Sarno is located in the Sarno River valley, in which traces of human presence have been found that date back to as early as the 9th–6th centuries BC. San Marzano is first mentioned in 601 AD in a letter by Pope Gregory I. In 1220 Frederick II of Sicily gave it to the abbey of Montevergine, and in 1234 it was acquired by the Filangieri family, who held it until the Angevine conquest of the Kingdom of Naples. Later families who held the title of San Marzano include the Del Tufo, Mastrili, and Albertini families.

The town suffered damage during World War II.

See also
San Marzano tomato

References

Cities and towns in Campania